Sarkology is the third studio album by Ghanaian hip-hop recording artist Sarkodie. It was released by Duncwills Entertainment on January 2, 2014. Primarily recorded in Twi, the album features guest appearances from Fuse ODG, Davido, Tiwa Savage, Banky W., Timaya, 2 Face Idibia, Efya, Mugeez, Obrafour, Burna Boy, Vivian Chidid, Vector, Silvastone, Sk Blinks, Stonebwoy, Joey B, J Town, Lil Shaker, Raquel, Sian, Kofi B and AKA. Its production was handled by Magnom, Hammer, KillBeatz, Masterkraft and Silvastone, among others.

Buildup and release
There were reports that Sarkodie was gearing up to release the album at the end of 2013. Sarkology was also reported to contain 16 tracks. According to The Ghanaian Chronicle, Sarkodie told the press the album would contain 30 songs and would feature production from 13 producers, including KillBeatz, Magnom and Nshorna.

Album cover and launch concert
On August 28, 2013, Sarkodie released the album's cover art to the general public while he was in the U.K for a video shoot. The cover features a young boy surrounded by school textbooks and other educational materials. Sarkodie utilized the cover art to promote his clothing brand Sark.

Sarkology was promoted by the launch of an eponymous concert, which was held at the Accra Sports Stadium on December 21, 2013. The concert featured performances from Sarkodie, Stay Jay, Kwaw Kese, Efya, Fuse ODG, Joey B, Raquel, Ephraim, Donzy, Dee Moneey, Buda, Mr. Silver, Phoot Printz and Scizo.

Singles

The album's lead single "Gunshot" was released on November 12, 2012. It features guest vocals by Nigerian singer Davido and was produced by KillBeatz. The Sesan-directed visuals for "Gunshot" was released on December 11, 2012.

The album's second single "Illuminati" was released on November 27, 2012. The song was produced by Magnom and recorded in Sarkodie's native language Twi. Its music video was shot in Dubai at various locations by Gyogyimah of Phamous Philms. The video was uploaded to YouTube on August 19, 2013. After releasing "Illuminati", Sarkodie was jokingly rumored to have joined the "secret clan".

The Lil Shaker-assisted track "Lies" was released as the album's third single. Its music video was directed by Nana-Asi Hene. According to OkayAfrica, the video "juggles images of a broken mannequin/past lover to the backdrop of Sarkodie's flashy whips, mansions, pools and penthouses." The album's fourth single "Bounce" was released on September 19, 2013; its accompanying music video was directed by Sesan. "Down on One" was released as the album's fifth single on October 10, 2013. It features vocals by Fuse ODG and was produced by Killbeatz. The music video for "Down on One" was shot and directed in the U.K by Moe Musa.

The album's sixth single "Pon D Ting" was released on December 23, 2013. It features guest vocals by Banky W. and was produced by Masterkraft. The music video for the song was shot during Sarkodie's trip to South Africa for the 2013 Channel O Music Video Awards.

On December 31, 2013, Sarkodie released "Ordinary Love" as the album's seventh single. The song was produced by Beat Merchant and features vocals by Tiwa Savage. Efya was initially intended to be on the track, but Sarkodie ended up contacting Savage because he wanted something different.

The album's eighth single "Preach" was released on January 9, 2014. The song features a verse from UK-based recording artist and record producer Silvastone. An accompanying music video for "Preach" was released on February 3, 2014 and uploaded to YouTube.

Critical reception
Sarkology received mostly positive reviews from music critics. Jacob Roberts-Mensah and Ameyaw Debrah awarded the album 9 stars out of 10, commending Sarkodie for "blurring the lines between hiplife and hip-hop without necessarily being boxed in or defined by either genre".

Accolades
Sarkology won Album of the Year at the 2014 Ghana Music Awards. It was also nominated for World’s Best Album at the 2014 World Music Awards.

Track listing

Notes
"—" denotes a skit

Personnel

Michael Owusu Addo – primary artist 
Nana Richard Abiona – featured artist 
David Adeleke – featured artist
Tiwatope Savage Balogun – featured artist
Darryl Bannerman-Martin – featured artist
Olubankole Wellington – featured artist 
Enetimi Alfred Odom – featured artist
Innocent Ujah Idibia – featured artist 
Jane Fara Awindor – featured artist 
Rashid Mugeez – featured artist
Michael Elliot – featured artist 
Damini Ogulu – featured artist 
Vivian Chidid – featured artiste 
Olanrewaju Ogunmefun – featured artist 
Silvastone – producer, featured artist 
Sk Blinks – featured artist 
Sarkodie – primary Artist 
Livingston E. Satekla – composer 
Stefen Menson – featured artist 
Stonebwoy – featured artist 
Raquel Ammah – composer 
Raquel – featured artist 
Sian – featured artist 
Kofi Boakye – featured artist 
Kiernan Forbes – featured artist 
Lil Shaker – producer, featured artist 
Hammer – producer
Magnom – producer 
Hammer – producer 
Killbeatz – producer 
King of Accra – producer 
Masterkraft – producer 
RedEye – mixing, mastering

Release history

References

2014 albums
Albums produced by Masterkraft (producer)
Sarkodie (rapper) albums